Ricky Akbar Ohorella (born 31 December 1990 in  Indonesia) is an Indonesian professional footballer who plays as a right-back for Liga 2 club PSIM Yogyakarta.

International career 
He made his debut for Indonesia in 2014 FIFA World Cup qualification against Bahrain on 29 February 2012.

Honours

Club honours
Semen Padang
Indonesia Premier League: 2011–12
Indonesian Community Shield: 2013
Arema
Indonesia President's Cup: 2019

References

External links
 
 Ricky Ohorella at Liga Indonesia
 

1990 births
Living people
People from Tulehu
Indonesian footballers
Indonesia international footballers
Sportspeople from Maluku (province)
Persikad Depok players
Persibom Bolaang Mongondow players
Persih Tembilahan players
Semen Padang F.C. players
Borneo F.C. players
Arema F.C. players
Liga 1 (Indonesia) players
Association football wingers
Association football fullbacks